Lake F. Russell (April 6, 1898 – December 26, 1980) was an American football coach. He served as the head football coach at Carson–Newman College from 1924 to 1928 and compiled a record of 16–20–3. After leaving Carson–Newman, Russell coached at Mercer University from 1929 to 1940 and compiled a record of 46–61–5. He also served as head men's basketball coach at Mercer from 1929 to 1930, from 1932 to 1934 and again from 1936 to 1939.

Serving as an assistant coach since 1949, Russell was named head coach in 1954 at Miami Beach Senior High School in Miami Beach, Florida. He served as head coach at Miami Beach through August 1955 when he resigned to become the superintendent of the State Training & Agricultural School in Nashville, Tennessee.

A native of Ducktown, Tennessee, Russell graduated from Carson–Newman in 1925. He died on December 26, 1980, at River Park Hospital in McMinnville, Tennessee.

Head coaching record

College football

References

External links
 

1898 births
1980 deaths
Carson–Newman Eagles baseball coaches
Carson–Newman Eagles football coaches
Mercer Bears athletic directors
Mercer Bears football coaches
Mercer Bears men's basketball coaches
High school football coaches in Florida
Carson–Newman University alumni
People from Polk County, Tennessee
Coaches of American football from Tennessee
Baseball coaches from Tennessee
Basketball coaches from Tennessee